Grand Ayatollah Mohammed Taher bin Abdul-hameed bin Isa bin Hasan bin Shubayr bin Thiab bin Mohammed bin Harb al-Khaqani (30 November 1911 - 28 January 1986) (Arabic:اية الله العظمى الشيخ محمد طاهر بن عبدالحميد بن عيسى بن حسن بن شبير بن ذياب بن محمد بن حرب الخاقاني). He was a leading Iranian Arab Shia cleric from Ahwaz.Khaqani was imprisoned after the 1979 Revolution in Iran for his opposition to the velayat-e faqih and his promotion of autonomy for the Ahwazi Arabs of Iran's Khuzestan province. The Grand Ayatollah died in suspicious circumstances in 1986 while under house arrest in Qom.

His son, Sheikh Mohammed Baqir al-Khaqani, today lives in Kuwait, and his younger brother Sheikh Isa Al-Khaqani lives in Bahrain.

References

Iranian Shia clerics
1986 deaths
Year of birth missing
Ahwazi Arabs
People who have been placed under house arrest in Iran
Iranian Arab Islamic scholars